Daniel R. Walrath is a retired United States Army major general who last served as the Commanding General of United States Army South from July 16, 2019 to June 30, 2021. Previously, he served as the Deputy Chief of Staff for Strategy and Policy of the Resolute Support Mission and Deputy Commander of United States Forces–Afghanistan.

References

External links
 

Year of birth missing (living people)
Living people
Place of birth missing (living people)
United States Army generals